Orin Starn is an anthropologist and writer at Duke University.

Starn is the author of Ishi's Brain: In Search of America's Last Wild Indian and co-author of The Shining Path: Love, Madness, and Revolution in the Andes with Miguel La Serna; his other books include The Passion of Tiger Woods: An Anthropologist Reports on Golf, Race, and Celebrity Scandal, Nightwatch: The Politics of Protest in the Andes, and he is co-editor of The Peru Reader, Between Resistance and Revolution, and Indigenous Experience Today. Starn has chaired the Duke Cultural Anthropology department, directed the Duke Center for Latin American and Caribbean Studies and been the faculty director of the Duke Human Rights Center.

He has appeared on many radio and television programs, and writes for newspapers including the Los Angeles Times and Chronicle of Higher Education.  Starn teaches courses about Latin America, Native American culture and politics, human rights, and sports and society, among other issues. Starn won Duke University’s Robert B. Cox Distinguished Teaching Award in 2004 and was awarded the Sally Dalton Robinson Distinguished Professorship effective July 1, 2005.

Ishi, the Andes, and Indigenous Rights

Starn was involved in the repatriation to California of the remains of Ishi, the last Yahi Indian.
This search was reported in the New York Times and NPR, and Starn's book Ishi's Brain gives an account of it as well as the story of Ishi's life.  Ishi's Brain was a San Francisco Chronicle Best Book of 2004.

He has also written extensively about war and society in Peru, including The Shining Path, Nightwatch and The Peru Reader as well as several books in Spanish.  A book Starn co-edited with Marisol de la Cadena, Indigenous Experience Today, explores the global rise of indigenous politics and activism.

Sports, Society, and the College Athletics
Starn has done research on sports and society, and appeared on ESPN and various sports talk shows. His online course “Sports and Society” has drawn thousands of students worldwide. He also maintains a related blog at Golf Politics.

Starn wrote op-eds in North Carolina newspapers about the 2006 Duke University lacrosse case (among them, Let's talk sports) and was quoted in other outlets, including The New Yorker
 and 
The News & Observer.

During the case, Starn took issue with some of Duke Basketball Coach Mike Krzyzewski's actions.  In a June 21, 2006 article in The News & Observer, Starn was quoted as stating, "Whether Coach Krzyzewski likes it or not, these are serious issues and issues being raised at colleges around the country."  He also accused bloggers of inaccurately portraying the involvement of Duke faculty in the lacrosse case in a January 2007 op-ed in the Durham Herald-Sun.

Starn has cited the incident in his criticism of Duke's participation in Division I athletics.  In another News & Observer article, Starn was quoted as stating, "It's ridiculous to talk about a balance between athletics and academics... Athletics should be a subset underneath a university's main mission... The idea that athletics should have near-equal weight with academics is just wrong."

Writings 
 The Shining Path: Love, Madness, and Revolution in the Andes. Co-author with Miguel La Serna. New York: W. W. Norton, 2019.
 The Passion of Tiger Woods: An Anthropologist Reports on Golf, Race, and Celebrity Scandal. Durham: Duke University Press (2011)
 Ishi's Brain: In Search of America's Last 'Wild' Indian. New York: W. W. Norton, 2004.
 Nightwatch: The Politics of Protest in the Andes. Durham, NC: Duke UP, 1999.
 "Maoism in the Andes: The Communist Party in Peru -- Shining Path and the Refusal of History." In Critical Perspectives on Mao Zedong's Thought. Edited by Arif Dirlik, Paul Healy, and Nick Knight. Atlantic Highlands, NJ: Humanities Press, 1997. 267-288. 
 Between Resistance and Revolution: Cultural Politics and Social Protest  Co-editor with Richard G. Fox. New Brunswick, NJ: Rutgers UP, 1997.
 The Peru Reader: History, Culture, Politics. Co-editor with Carlos Ivan Degregori and Robin Kirk. Durham, NC: Duke UP, 1995.
Indigenous Experience Today (co-editor)
Here Come the Anthros (2009)
Nursing the Revolution (1991)
The Revolt against Revolution (1995)

References

External links
Golf Politics
Ishi's Brain: In Search of America's Last "Wild" Indian

American anthropologists
American non-fiction writers
Duke University faculty
Historians of Peru
Latin Americanists
Living people
Year of birth missing (living people)